Miss Asia Pacific International 2017 (MAPI) is a beauty pageant in Asia. It began in the 1960s, the oldest in Asia. It is based in the Philippines with forty-two women from all over the world. In 2016, Miss Asia Pacific International came under new ownership and management.

The finals were held at the Newport Performing Arts Theater of Resorts World Manila on Thursday, November 29, 2016. Francielly Ouriques of Brazil took the crown. The swimsuit competition was held in Puerto Princesa City. The top awards went to Louisa Brown of Australia for Miss Congeniality and Best National Costume to Rita Nurmaliza of Indonesia.

Results  

Order of Announcements

Top 15

Top 10

Top 5

Special Awards

Special Awards II

Candidates
42 candidates competed:
  – Louisa Brown
  – Karyna Kisialiova
  – Francielly Ouriques
  – Maleeka Singh
  – Wen Dou
  – Yhully Bell Gomez
  – Lydia Simonis-Tariu
  – Kimberly Porras Boza
  – Tiare Faundez
  – Farah Kamal Abou-Seada
  – Janeth Steffany Erazo
  – Laura Deflandre
  – Anastasia Bersch
  – Annania Grace Nauta
  – Valeria Cardona
  – O Ka Ki
  – Donna Eunice Cruz
  – Sonika Roy
  – Rita Nurmaliza
  – Yuki Sonoda
  Korea – Song Hyeonjin
  – Souad Hanna
  – Si Yi Yuan
  – Kah Yin Lai
  – Aylasha Ramrachia
  – Jade Yañez
  – Anundari Dashdorj
  – Htwe Ei Kyaw
  – Sahara Basnet
  – Morgan Doelwijt
  – Acacia Walker
  – Katering Medina
  – Patricia Seminario
  – Ilene De Vera
  – Viktoria Dashieva
  – Lynette Chua
  – Chanelle Soncini
  – Hasini Samuel
  – Francisca Wong Loi Sing
  – Wen Yin Ting
  – Lisa Suwannaketkarn
  – Vuong Thanh Tuyen

See also
 List of beauty contests
 Miss Asia Pacific International

References

External links
Official website

2017 beauty pageants
2017